Kendal Cronkhite was most recently the Production Designer for DreamWorks Animation's Trolls.

She started her career in film as the assistant art director for Disney's critical and commercial success, The Nightmare Before Christmas.
In 1996, she art directed Disney's James and the Giant Peach with fellow art director Bill Boes.

In 1998, she art directed Antz for the newly founded DreamWorks Animation. After the success of this film, she would go on to production design a long run of films for the studio including Madagascar and both its sequels, Madagascar: Escape 2 Africa and Madagascar 3: Europe's Most Wanted. The series was a critical and commercial success, and became a staple franchise for the studio.

In 2016, she production designed Trolls, another critical and commercial success. In 2020, she production designed the film's sequel, Trolls World Tour, which proved another success and was considered significant in its online-only release due to the COVID-19 outbreak.

Cronkhite is highly regarded as a Production Designer, having been a staple at DreamWorks for over twenty years.

References

External links
 

Year of birth missing (living people)
Living people
DreamWorks Animation people
Women production designers
American production designers